The Brunswick Historic District includes the historic center of the railroad town of Brunswick, Maryland.  The district includes the 18th century former town of Berlin, the Baltimore and Ohio Railroad yards along the Potomac River, and the town built between 1890 and 1910 to serve the railroad.

Brunswick Historic District was listed on the National Register of Historic Places in 1979.

See also
Brunswick (MARC station)

References

External links
, including 2006 photo, at Maryland Historical Trust
Boundary Map of the Brunswick Historic District, Frederick County, at Maryland Historical Trust
Brunswick Historic District, at Journey Through Hallowed Ground

Historic districts on the National Register of Historic Places in Maryland
Historic districts in Frederick County, Maryland
National Register of Historic Places in Frederick County, Maryland